A carbine ( or ), from French carabine, is a long arm firearm but with a shorter barrel than a rifle or musket. Many carbines are shortened versions of full-length rifles, shooting the same ammunition, while others fire lower-powered ammunition, including types designed for pistols.

Below is the list of carbines.

See also
 List of assault rifles
 List of battle rifles
 List of flamethrowers
 List of machine guns
 List of multiple-barrel firearms
 List of pistols
 List of revolvers
 List of semi-automatic pistols
 List of shotguns
 List of submachine guns

References

Carbines
carbine